Dr Jingan MacPherson Young/Yeung-Lefroy Brooks is a Hong Kong born playwright, screenwriter, film scholar and journalist.

Her book Soho on Screen, the first study of London's Soho in film was published by Berghahn Books in May 2022.

She is currently a Lecturer in Screenwriting at Birkbeck, University of London.

She is the daughter of John Dragon Young (1949–1996), a scholar of Chinese history and politician in Hong Kong.

Education 

Jingan  was educated at King's College London with a BA (Hons) in English and Film Studies and Kellogg College, Oxford with a Master of Studies in Creative Writing. She also holds a Foundation in Art from Parsons School of Design. In 2020, she successfully completed a PhD in Film Studies at King's College London.

Theatre, Film and TV 

Her play Filth or "Failed in London, Try Hong Kong" was the first play commissioned and produced in the English language by the Hong Kong Arts Festival and ran during the 42nd festival in March 2014.
Her plays have been produced at the Vault Festival, Park Theatre, The Pleasance, and the Birmingham Repertory Theatre. These include I'm Just Here to Buy Soy Sauce, The 38th Parallel, Confucius Say Don't Use F* Tinder on a Full Moon and Life and Death of a Journalist, on the Hong Kong protests, which premiered in February 2020. The Guardian called it intensely smart...prickling with intelligence and anger.

She was a member of the Royal Court Theatre Young Writers Programme and Soho Theatre Young Company Writers' Lab. In 2016 she was awarded the Michael Grandage Futures Bursary to write a play on Hong Kong's last Governor Christopher Patten. In 2020 she was part of the prestigious Channel 4 Screenwriting Programme and the inaugural Sky Studios Comedy Scheme in 2022.

She was named as a writer to watch amongst 200 broadcasting stars of the future by the BBC and Idris Elba as New Talent Hotlist 2017.

She is writing for CBBC (TV channel) and has multiple projects in development including a British East Asian romantic comedy with Greenacre Films.

Works 

She is the curator and editor of Foreign Goods: A Selection of Writing by British East Asian Arts, the first collection of plays by British East Asian writing published by Oberon Books. The foreword is written by David Henry Hwang.

She is a contributor to Sight & Sound and The Guardian.

References

External links
 
 Filth in the South China Morning Post
 BBC Talent Hotlist
 Foreign Goods: A Selection of Writing by British East Asian Artists
 Interview with BBC Front Row
 Life and Death of a Journalist 
 Number 2 Daughter in Broadcast Now
 Book Soho on Screen
 Sky Studios announces final writers for Sky Comedy
 Sight & Sound Feature on Soho B Films
 Soho on Screen book''

Living people
Year of birth missing (living people)
Alumni of King's College London
Alumni of Kellogg College, Oxford
Hong Kong dramatists and playwrights